In 2017, there were 40+ colleges of education in Ghana, up from 38 in 2015. The colleges are responsible for teacher education. A further two private colleges are to be absorbed into the group of 41 public institutions, raising the number to 43. Currently there are 46 Public Colleges of Education in Ghana

This is a list of the 40+ Colleges of Education in Ghana:
 Abetifi Presbyterian College of Education, Kwahu Abetifi
 Accra College of Education, Greater Accra
 Ada College of Education, Ada
 Agogo Presbyterian College of Education, Agogo
 Akatsi College of Education, Akatsi
 Akrokerri College of Education, Akrokerri
Al-Faruq College of Education, Wenchi/Droboso (newly absorbed college, 2017)
 Atebubu College of Education, Atebubu
 Bagabaga College of Education, Tamale
 Bia Lamplighter College of Education, Sefwi-Debiso (newly absorbed college, 2016)
 Berekum College of Education, Berekum
 Dambai College of Education, Dambai
 Enchi College of Education, Enchi
 Evangelical Presbyterian College of Education, Amedzofe
 Evangelical Presbyterian College of Education, Bimbilla
 Foso College of Education, Assin Foso
 Gambaga College of Education, Gambaga (newly absorbed college, 2016)
 Gbewaa College of Education, Pusiga constituency, Bawku Municipal District
 Holy Child College of Education, Sekondi-Takoradi
 Jasikan College of Education, Jasikan
 Kibi Presbyterian College of Education, Kibi
 Komenda College of Education, Kommenda, Ghana
 Mampong Technical College of Education, Mampong
 Methodist College of Education (Ghana), Akim Oda
 Mount Mary College of Education, Somanya
 Nusrat Jahan Ahmadiyya College of Education, Wa
 Our Lady of Apostles (OLA) College of Education, Cape Coast
 Offinso College of Education, Offinso
 Peki College of Education, Peki
 Presbyterian Women's College of Education, Aburi
 Presbyterian College of Education, Akropong–Akuapem
 Seventh Day Adventist (SDA) College of Education, Asokore
 St. Ambrose College of Education, Dormaa Akwamu, Dormaa Municipal District (newly absorbed college, 2016)
 St. Francis College of Education, Hohoe
 St. John Bosco’s College of Education, Navrongo
 St. Joseph’s College of Education, Bechem
 St. Louis College of Education, Kumasi
 St. Monica's College of Education, Mampong
 St. Teresa's College of Education, Hohoe
 Tamale College of Education, Tamale
 Tumu College of Education, Tumu
 Wesley College of Education, Kumasi
 Wiawso College of Education, Sefwi-Wiawso District (Municipal)
St. Vincent College of Education, Yendi
McCoy College of Education
Agona SDA College of Education

See also 
List of universities in Ghana
List of polytechnics in Ghana
List of Nursing Training Colleges in Ghana
 :Category:Colleges of Education in Ghana

External links 
 National Accreditation Board, Ghana - Public Colleges of Education
 National Accreditation Board, Ghana - Private Colleges of Education

References 

 
Colleges of Education